The Marsh Ecology Award is a prize awarded annually from 1996 onwards to recognise outstanding recent discovery or development which has had a significant impact on the development of the science of ecology or its application. The Award is an honorarium of £1,000 and is open to ecologists from anywhere in the world. The award is given by the Marsh Charitable Trust and the British Ecological Society in cooperation.

Marsh Ecology Award Laureates
Source: British Ecological Society
1996 John Lawton
1997 J. Philip Grime
1998 Tim H. Clutton-Brock
1999 John L. Harper
2000 William J. Sutherland
2001 Sam Berry
2002 James H. Brown
2003 Andrew Watkinson
2004 Stephen P. Hubbell
2005 Ilkka Hanski
2006 Phil Ineson
2007 Christian Körner
2008 not awarded
2009 Michael Begon
2010 Jeremy Thomas
2011 E.J. Milner-Gulland
2012 Tim Coulson
2013 Kevin J. Gaston
2014 Rosie Woodroffe
2015 Jane Memmott
2016 Lynne Boddy
2017 Sandra Lavorel
2018 Kathy Willis
2019 Andy Purvis
 2020 Teja Tscharntke
 2021 Julia Koricheva

See also
 List of ecology awards

References

External links
 Marsh Christian Trust

British science and technology awards
Awards established in 1996
Ecology awards
1996 establishments in the United Kingdom